Dominik Siedlaczek (born 11 March 1992) is a former Austrian decathlete.

He won the gold medal in athletics at 2015 European Games in Baku, finishing 1st on 110 metres hurdles, with a personal best of 14.07. In the same year he became 9th in decathlon at the 2015 Summer Universiade in Gwangju. He won several national titles in decathlon, hurdles and high jump. and holds several Viennese records.

Honours

In 2015, Siedlaczek won the Viennese Track & Field Athlete of the year award.

Retirement 

In 2018 he retired from professional sports and became a dual career advisor.

References

External links
IAAF Athlete’s profile
OELV Athleten Profil

Athletes (track and field) at the 2015 European Games
1992 births
Austrian decathletes
Living people
European Games gold medalists for Austria
European Games medalists in athletics
Place of birth missing (living people)